The Old Tennent Cemetery is a non-denominational community cemetery adjacent to the Old Tennent Church in Manalapan, New Jersey, with which it was affiliated until 1910. The cemetery was established in 1731, when the congregation moved from its location in nearby Wickatunk, New Jersey. The cemetery replaced what is known as the Old Scots Burying Ground.

Notable burials

 Elmer H. Geran (1875–1954), Democratic Party politician who represented  from 1925–1927
 Thomas Henderson (1743–1824), U.S. Representative and New Jersey Governor
 Henry Monckton (1740–1778), British Army officer during the American Revolutionary War
 Catherine Dale Owen (1900–1965), stage and film actress
 Nathaniel Scudder (1733–1781), Continental Congressman
 Guy Tripp (1865–1927), business executive and U.S. Army brigadier general

References

External links
 The Old Tennent Cemetery Association
 
 

Cemeteries in Monmouth County, New Jersey
Manalapan Township, New Jersey
1731 establishments in New Jersey
Pre-statehood history of New Jersey